Wanda Nevada is a 1979 American Western film starring Peter Fonda and Brooke Shields as the title character. It was also Fonda's last directed feature, and last film where he pulled double duty as actor and director.

Henry Fonda makes a cameo appearance as an Arizona prospector, making it the only film to feature the father and son together.  Peter Fonda reportedly paid Henry $1000 for one day's work on the film after receiving a call from his father that he was out of work.

Plot 
Set in 1950s Arizona, the story follows a drifter and gambler named Beaudray Demerille (Fonda). In a card game he wins the movie's title character Wanda Nevada (Shields), a 13-year-old orphan with dreams of singing at the Grand Ole Opry. Despite his best efforts, Wanda sticks to Demerille, accompanying him to a pool hall. Texas Curly (Fix), an aging prospector, enters and tells the bar patrons about his gold mine in the Grand Canyon. They laugh him off as a drunk. As Curly leaves the bar, he drops a pouch. Wanda picks it up and follows Curly, then sees Strap Pangburn (Markland) and Ruby Muldoon (Askew), two cons from the bar, harassing the man about the location of the mine. Wanda runs when Strap and Ruby kill Curly, alerting them to her presence. She hides in Demerille's car and tells him about Curly's death. Strap and Ruby see Wanda in the car but get lost in the chase. Stopped for the night, Demerille and Wanda open Curly's pouch and find a map. They head to the Grand Canyon and trade the car for pack mules and mining supplies. Strap and Ruby follow behind by half a day.

While traveling in the canyon Demerille and Wanda meet Dorothy Deerfield (Lewis), a Life magazine photographer. Dorothy and Demerille try to get better acquainted after dinner in her tent, but jealous Wanda intrudes. They discuss their pasts, with Dorothy's husband and Wanda's father both killed during military service. Demerille tries to be nice but comes off as insensitive, and he and Wanda leave camp in the morning. They find a rope ladder over the canyon's side to a small cave. Before going down, Wanda confesses to Demerille that she loves him. He holds the rope as she rappels down the rock wall. An owl flies out at her and Wanda falls, but Demerille pulls her back up only to find that she is unconscious. He sits cradling Wanda and says he loves her, too. Demerille then explores the cave himself and finds gold. He returns to find Wanda awake and shows her a large gold piece. While mining the next day, Strap and Ruby finally catch up to them. Wanda and Demerille return to camp with four bags of gold only to find their mules gone. They throw the bags into the canyon in case someone is watching, then start walking. Strap and Ruby hold them at gunpoint and demand the gold, but Wanda insists there was none. A shootout leaves everyone unharmed. Strap and Ruby run off, and Demerille and Wanda seek shelter for the night. The following morning they find Strap and Ruby crucified in the desert. Wanda finds the mined gold scattered nearby. They pack it up and head down to the shore, where a boat is buried in the sand. After docking downstream, Demerille counts the gold as Wanda sleeps. The owl from the cave appears and an arrow is shot from the distance into Demerille's chest. Demerille, seemingly mortally wounded, pushes the boat into the river and passes out. Wanda wakes up the next morning as the boat is afloat in the river and finds Demerille near the edge of death, he professes his love for Wanda and passes out.

Sometime later, Wanda is in a hotel and is about to be returned to the orphanage by looming nuns. Reporters swarm the hotel lobby, all trying to get an exclusive story. Wanda flees the nuns as Demerille, now recovered and rich from selling the gold, pulls up outside the hotel in a new convertible. Wanda jumps in the convertible, and both laugh as Demerille tells the reporters there never was any gold in the Grand Canyon and Demerille and Wanda drive off into the sunset, while the song Morning Sun by Carole King adds to the atmospheric finale.

Cast 
 Brooke Shields as Wanda Nevada 
 Peter Fonda as Beaudray Demerille 
 Fiona Lewis as Dorothy Deerfield 
 Luke Askew as Ruby Muldoon
 Ted Markland as Strap Pangburn
 Severn Darden as Bitterstix 
 Paul Fix as Texas Curly 
 Henry Fonda as Prospector

Production 
Parts of the film were shot in Glen Canyon, Monument Valley, Mexican Hat, and the Colorado River in Utah as well as Prescott, Arizona.

Peter Fonda said ""U.A. dumped the film.... The studio just didn’t understand the picture... I had wanted them to sell the film back to me. I offered the studio six million dollars... They didn’t take me up on it."

Reception 
Todd McCarthy of Variety called the film "a serio-comic romance which is unconvincing on virtually every level. What charm it has stems from the quirky convergence of several different genres, but Peter Fonda's third directorial outing is all but sunk by Brooke Shields' critically deficient performance." Gene Siskel of the Chicago Tribune awarded 2 stars out of 4 and called it "a desperate film trying to make it through in bits and pieces rather than through one consistently written script." Kevin Thomas of the Los Angeles Times was generally positive and wrote, "It's all stuff and nonsense—your typical 'relationship' movie—but it's pretty ingratiating all the same. The neophyte Hackin seems a born storyteller, and Fonda, who also directs, brings a depth of perception and feeling to 'Wanda Nevada' that makes it quite appealing." Rick Groen of The Globe and Mail declared the film "the least able fable imaginable. Screenwriter Dennis Hackin's idea of profundity is to toss in characters and ideas like so many candies into a grab bag, and with just as much substance ... It also contains every piece of clichéd Western dialogue ever uttered. One kindly assumes that was deliberate, but cliches in themselves, put to no larger purpose, don't make a film camp or ironic. They just make it bad."

Home media
The film has been released on VHS, DVD and in digital format.

References

External links 
 
 
 
 Review from Boca Raton News

1979 films
1979 Western (genre) films
American Western (genre) films
Films directed by Peter Fonda
Films scored by Ken Lauber
Films shot in Utah
Films shot in Arizona
Films set in Arizona
Films set in the 1950s
Neo-Western films
Treasure hunt films
United Artists films
1970s English-language films
1970s American films